The 1930 Arizona Wildcats football team represented the University of Arizona as an independent during the 1930 college football season. In their 16th and final season under head coach Pop McKale, the Wildcats compiled a 6–1–1 record, shut out six of eight opponents, and outscored all opponents, 122 to 33. The team captains were Waldo M. Dicus and William Hargis.  The team played its home games at Arizona Stadium in Tucson, Arizona.

Senior halfback Bill "Eel" Hargis was the team's star player.

Schedule

References

Arizona
Arizona Wildcats football seasons
Arizona Wildcats football